Aftab Iqbal  is a Pakistani television host, journalist and businessman who founded Aap Media Group. He is a former host of TV programs Hasb-e-Haal on Dunya News (2009-2010), Khabarnaak on Geo News (2010-2015), Khabardaar on Express News (2015-2018), Himaqatain (2018-2020) on 92 News and Khabarzar on Aap News (2018–2020), and Khabarzar on Neo News (2020-2021).

He is now hosting Khabarhaar on Samaa News. His presence on digital media is through his YouTube channel Aftab Iqbal started on January 7, 2017. In October 2018, he launched his TV Channel Aap News, where he fulfilled administrative affairs. In January 2020, he left his own channel and has joined Neo News. He left Neo News in January 2021 and went back on Express News and  hosts a show Khabardar on Express News, which he in turn left to start Khabarhaar on Samaa TV in 2022. He also introduced digital shows Open Mic Cafe, Amaniyat and Dialogue With History on his own YouTube channel Aftab Iqbal.

Life and career 
Aftab Iqbal was born on 9 September 1961. He received his master's degree from Government College University (Lahore) in 1985 and then went on to get a diploma in History of Mass Communications from San Jose State University in California in 1986.

He then worked as a reporter from 1986 to 1987 and held some positions in the private sector companies of Pakistan. Then he briefly worked as a 'Media Advisor' to Chief Minister of Punjab (Pakistan) from 1994 to 1995. After that, he used to write a column by the name "Aaftabian" in Nawa-i-Waqt newspaper from 1995 to 2010.

He is the son of well-known poet Zafar Iqbal who also has been writing columns for Pakistani newspapers for over 35 years.

Many people in Pakistan give him credit for playing a key role in boosting the viewership and TV ratings at three Pakistani TV channels.

He also used to write this program's script and, as a host of the show, used to try to keep it focused on the political comedy and satire and not let it wander aimlessly. The crew and cast of Khabarnaak used to do parodies or mimicries of Pakistan's known politicians like Sheikh Rasheed Ahmad, Rehman Malik, Shahbaz Sharif, Anwar Maqsood, Pakistani TV personality Tariq Aziz and pop music artist Ali Azmat among many others. Aftab Iqbal used to include a short educational segment in this program, called Zabaan-o-Bayaan in which he used to point out language pronunciation errors made by the common public.

He currently appears in a show named Open Mic Cafe hosted by Dr. Arooba on his Youtube channel. He also appears in a show named Loose Cannon hosted by himself on his Youtube channel named "Karakoram TV". He has also launched a new youtube channel by the name of Aftabiyan and is uploading a show Mailbox with Aftab Iqbal currently on Aftabiyan with a promise to upload a sitcom and a film.

Filmography

Reality shows

Web shows

References

External links 
 

1961 births
Living people
People from Okara, Pakistan
Pakistani television hosts
Pakistani television people
Pakistani television writers
Pakistani male journalists
Pakistani columnists
Male television writers
Pakistani mass media businesspeople
Pakistani mass media owners
Government College University, Lahore alumni
San Jose State University alumni